Ovidiu Alin Hațegan (born 14 July 1980) is a Romanian professional football referee who officiates primarily in the Liga I and for FIFA as a FIFA international referee. He is ranked as a UEFA elite category referee.

Football career
Born in Arad, Hațegan became a FIFA referee in 2008. He went to referee at both the UEFA Euro 2012 and 2014 FIFA World Cup qualifying campaigns.

In 2013, UEFA president Michel Platini ordered an internal investigation to ascertain why Hațegan did not apply the protocol for dealing with allegedly racist chants from the crowd during a match at the Arena Khimki between Manchester City and PFC CSKA Moscow. CSKA Moscow was later charged with "racist behavior" for the incident, but Hațegan was absolved of blame. 

In August 2016, Hațegan refereed in the men's football tournament at the 2016 Summer Olympics. He refereed two matches during this tournament, including the semifinal between Brazil and Honduras.

On 9 November 2017, he was in charge of the first leg of the 2018 World Cup qualification play-off between Northern Ireland and Switzerland. During this match, he awarded a penalty kick to Switzerland after the ball struck the arm of Northern Irish defender Corry Evans, which was tucked closely against his body. Switzerland scored the penalty kick and would go on to defeat Northern Ireland 1-0 on aggregate, earning qualification to the World Cup. Hațegan later admitted that he was wrong to award the penalty kick, and that this mistake may have played a part in his exclusion from the roster of match officials for the 2018 FIFA World Cup.

On 19 November 2018, after being informed at half-time of the UEFA Nations League fixture between Germany and the Netherlands of the death of his mother, and even though he could have legally been replaced, Hațegan chose to continue officiating until the end of the match, which ended 2–2 in Gelsenkirchen and qualified the visiting team to the final four. Visibly distraught, he was consoled after the full whistle by Dutch captain Virgil van Dijk.

Hațegan has refereed at two UEFA European Championships, officiating two group stage games each in the 2016 and 2020 tournaments.

In 2022, Hațegan suffered a heart attack; it is unclear whether he will retire from football.

Personal life
Hațegan majored in medicine at the Victor Babeș University in Timișoara. He later taught anatomy in English at the Vasile Goldiș Western University in his hometown.

Hațegan married his wife Nicoleta in 2009, with the couple parenting two children.

Refereeing record

UEFA Euro

Summer Olympics

See also 
 István Kovács
List of football referees

References

External links
Romanian Football Federation profile 
World Referee profile

1980 births
Living people
Sportspeople from Arad, Romania
Romanian football referees
UEFA Champions League referees
UEFA Europa League referees
UEFA Euro 2016 referees
Football referees at the 2016 Summer Olympics
UEFA Euro 2020 referees